Strange Old Brew is the second studio album by Norwegian black metal band Carpathian Forest. It was released on November 6, 2000, through Avantgarde Music. It was re-released under digipak format in 2007 by Peaceville Records, containing an extra track. Contrasting with the previous Carpathian Forest releases, the sonority of Strange Old Brew is their most experimental one so far, mixing black metal with jazz interludes. It was their first release with Anders Kobro and Tchort in the band's line-up.

The track "Theme from Nekromantikk" (sic) is a cover of the opening theme of the controversial 1987 horror movie Nekromantik, directed by Jörg Buttgereit.

The track "Return of the Freezing Winds" is one of the first tracks of Carpathian Forest's repertoire, being present already in their first demo tapes, Rehearsal Outtake and Bloodlust and Perversion.

Track listing

Personnel
Carpathian Forest
 Roger Rasmussen (Nattefrost) — vocals, guitars, keyboards
 Johnny Krøvel (Nordavind) — vocals, guitars, keyboards
 Anders Kobro — drums, percussion
 Terje Vik Schei (Tchort) — bass

Additional musicians
 Nina Hex — female backing vocals on "House of the Whipcord" and "Cloak of Midnight"
 Eivind Kulde — backing vocals on "Bloodcleansing" and "Return of the Freezing Winds"
 Arvid Thorsen (Mötorsen) — tenor saxophone on "House of the Whipcord"

Miscellaneous staff
 E. Øvestad — artwork (logo)
 Nordavind — photography
 Daniel Vrangsinn — artwork, design
 Terje Refsnes — production, mixing

References 

Carpathian Forest albums
2000 albums
Avantgarde Music albums